Terri Carmichael Jackson is the current executive director of the Women's National Basketball Players Association.

Biography 
Jackson studied law at Georgetown University, and hoped to pursue a career in law like her father LeRoy Carmichael. After graduating, she moved to New Orleans to start the non profit Back on the Block Foundation. She later taught law as a professor at Tulane University and worked at a law firm in Louisiana before becoming legal counsel for athletics at University of the District of Columbia. She spent four years as director of law, policy and governance for the NCAA before being named director of operations for the Women's National Basketball Players Association in 2016.

During her tenure as executive director of the WNBPA, Jackson the union opted out of its collective bargaining agreement with the WNBA for the first time in its history. As part of these changes, Jackson negotiated higher pay and increased maternity benefits for WNBA players. Jackson also protested the fining of WNBA players who wore unauthorized t-shirts that supported Black Lives Matter, along with other uniform infractions.

In 2020, Jackson was featured in Sports Illustrated's "The Unrelenting", on the most powerful women in sports.

In 2021, the WNBPA launched a multi-year partnership with PepsiCo in 2021 to help finance philanthropic causes.

Personal life 
Jackson is married to basketball player Jaren Jackson, whom she met while they were both studying at Georgetown University. The couple had a son, NBA player Jaren Jackson Jr., in 1999.

References

Living people
African-American women in business
Women's National Basketball Association
Georgetown University alumni
Year of birth missing (living people)